The Manado fruit bat (Boneia bidens) is a species of megabat in the family Pteropodidae. 

It is the only member of the genus Boneia. It was formerly classified in the genus Rousettus, but phylogenetic evidence supports them being distinct and belonging to completely different subfamilies: Rousettus belonging in Rousettinae, Boneia belonging in Harpyionycterinae.

It is endemic to Sulawesi island in Indonesia, including in North Sulawesi Province.).

References

Megabats
Bats of Indonesia
Endemic fauna of Indonesia
Mammals of Sulawesi
Near threatened animals
Near threatened biota of Asia
Mammals described in 1879
Taxonomy articles created by Polbot
Taxa named by Fredericus Anna Jentink